The Boscobel Grand Army of the Republic Hall is located in Boscobel, Wisconsin. It was added to the National Register of Historic Places in 2007. Additionally, it is listed on the Wisconsin State Register of Historic Places.

History
A local Baptist congregation built the building in 1871 as the First Baptist Church, with the interior an open 2-story nave. But the congregation left the building vacant in 1879. A few pews and the organ remain from that first incarnation as a church.

In 1896 the building was bought by the Grand Army of the Republic's local chapter, John McDermott Post #101 and Women's Relief Corps #32. They remodeled the building, splitting the nave into two floors, with a kitchen and other rooms on the first floor and with a meeting hall on the second floor – the current layout. The hall remained a meeting place for the G.A.R. until 1942. The site is now a museum.

References

Clubhouses on the National Register of Historic Places in Wisconsin
American Civil War museums in Wisconsin
Museums in Grant County, Wisconsin
Grand Army of the Republic buildings and structures
National Register of Historic Places in Grant County, Wisconsin
Churches completed in 1871
Churches in Grant County, Wisconsin